Diana Cynthia Clifton-Peach (born 17 March 1944) is a British former competitive figure skater. She is a three-time British national champion in ladies' singles. Clifton-Peach narrowly missed the podium at the 1957 and 1958 European Championships, finishing fourth each year, and was fifth at the 1958 World Championships. She finished 18th at the 1964 Winter Olympics.

Results

References

Diana Clifton-Peach trained at Streatham Ice Rink, South London around 1958, the rink was sectioned off to enable the public to skate without colliding with her

British female single skaters
English female single skaters
1944 births
Olympic figure skaters of Great Britain
Figure skaters at the 1964 Winter Olympics
Living people
People from Bromley